The Call of the Wolves is a 1989 children's picture book by Jim Murphy and illustrated by Mark Weatherby. It is about a young wolf that is separated from his pack during a caribou hunt but is eventually reunited.

Reception
In its review of The Call of the Wolves, Booklist wrote "The taut story line, compelling illustrations, and recently renewed interest in wolves make this fictionalized account valuable." and the School Library Journal  wrote "The exquisite ice-blue pages portray the majestic arctic wilderness in a wintry, snowy, half-light. Weatherby's animals spring to life, and he adeptly captures the movement, the stillness, the danger, and the calm of the text. Like Yoshida's Young Lions (Philomel, 1989), this should help generate appreciation for animals in the wild, and is also concerned with issues of separation and connection."  Kirkus Reviews calls it "a realistic story".

Awards and nominations
1992 Nevada Young Readers' Award - winner

References

1989 children's books
American picture books
Fictional wolves
Books about wolves
Arctic in fiction